The Security Detachment Iraq (SECDET Iraq) was  the final component of Australia's contribution to coalition operations in Iraq. SECDET was based on an Australian Army combined arms combat team consisting of an infantry company group and a troop of cavalry which operated the Australian Light Armoured (ASLAV) vehicles. The force's duties included static security guarding at the Australian Embassy in Baghdad and the protection of Australian diplomats by the 1st MP Bn (CPPT) and Cavalry (RAAC) escort/protection, also vehicle convoys. SECDET was withdrawn in August 2011, with the firm Unity Resources Group becoming responsible for providing security for Australia's diplomatic presence in Iraq.

Incidents
SECDET III engaged and destroyed an insurgent mortar team that had been firing on the Coalition Headquarters in the Green Zone. This was the first time an Australian ASLAV had used its 25mm Main Gun in combat.

SECDET IV had a Vehicle Borne Improvised Explosive Device (VBIED) detonate across the street from their HQ during their tour.  SECDET IV was also involved in a serious accident when an ASLAV rolled at high speed.

SECDET V was involved in a VBIED attack on 25 October 2004,  just short of an International Zone checkpoint, with the patrol suffering four wounded in action and serious damage to an ASLAV-25.  As a direct result of the incident, Trooper Matthew Millhouse died of his injuries in 2015. He is listed on the Australian War Memorial Honour Roll as a casualty of the Iraq War.

SECDET V was also involved in two incidents in the northern city of Tall Afar on 8 and 10 December 2004, when 3 Troop, A Squadron of the 2nd Cavalry Regiment was ambushed by insurgents using small arms and rocket propelled grenades.  The first incident involved the troop providing an armoured convoy escort to a US engineer unit travelling to Al Kasik. The convoy was ambushed in Tal Afar with the majority of the Australian callsigns returning fire from 25mm and .50cal. The second incident occurred a couple of days later in roughly the same location. The patrol was ambushed with insurgents using IED’s, small arms and rocket propelled grenades. The troop again returned fire en masse. During these firefights, the insurgents suffered unknown injuries and casualties, however no damage was inflicted on the Australian patrol.

SECDET VI had a VBIED detonate both on an ASLAV patrol on Route Irish and also on their HQ in Baghdad during their tour.

Private Jacob Kovco was a member of SECDET IX in 2006.

Deployments

See also
 Australian contribution to the 2003 invasion of Iraq
 Australian Embassy Guard Platoon, Saigon

Notes

Military units and formations of the Australian Army
Military units and formations established in 2003
Military units and formations disestablished in 2011